Manuel Salazar y Baquíjano, Count of Vistaflorida (July 24, 1777 – November 7, 1850) was a Peruvian politician who briefly served as the Interim President of Peru from June to August 1827.

Salazar served as the President of the Congress in 1823. He served as the Vice President of Peru from August 1827 to June 1829. He served as the President of the Senate from 1845 to 1849.
His parents were José Antonio de Salazar y Breña and Francisca Baquíjano y Carrillo de Córdoba. José Baquíjano was Manuel Salazar's uncle.

References

1777 births
1850 deaths
Peruvian people of Spanish descent
Presidents of Peru
Vice presidents of Peru
Presidents of the Congress of the Republic of Peru
Presidents of the Senate of Peru